Opisthograptis moelleri is a moth of the  family Geometridae. It is found in northeast Asia.

The wingspan is 45–55 mm.

References

Moths described in 1893
Ourapterygini